Edward Everett "Hook" Mylin (October 23, 1894 – June 19, 1975) was an American football player and coach of football, basketball, and baseball.  He served as the head coach at Lebanon Valley College (1923–1933), Bucknell University (1934–1936), Lafayette College (1937–1942, 1946), and New York University (1947–1949), compiling a career college football record of 99–95–17.  Mylin was also the head basketball coach at Lebanon Valley from 1923 to 1934 and the head baseball coach at Bucknell from 1935 to 1937.  He was inducted into the College Football Hall of Fame as a coach in 1974.

Playing career and military service
Mylin attended Franklin & Marshall College, where he played football as a quarterback and was a member of the Chi Phi Fraternity before graduating in 1916. He served as a lieutenant in the United States Army during World War I and was wounded in France.

Head coaching record

College football

References

External links
 

1894 births
1975 deaths
American football quarterbacks
Bucknell Bison baseball coaches
Bucknell Bison football coaches
Franklin & Marshall Diplomats football players
Iowa State Cyclones football coaches
Lafayette Leopards football coaches
Lebanon Valley Flying Dutchmen football coaches
Lebanon Valley Flying Dutchmen men's basketball coaches
NYU Violets football coaches
High school football coaches in Virginia
College Football Hall of Fame inductees
United States Army officers
United States Army personnel of World War I
People from Lancaster County, Pennsylvania
Coaches of American football from Pennsylvania
Players of American football from Pennsylvania
Basketball coaches from Pennsylvania
Military personnel from Pennsylvania